Plamen Yankov (born 1 October 1954) is a Bulgarian boxer. He competed at the 1976 Summer Olympics and the 1980 Summer Olympics.

References

1954 births
Living people
Bulgarian male boxers
Olympic boxers of Bulgaria
Boxers at the 1976 Summer Olympics
Boxers at the 1980 Summer Olympics
Place of birth missing (living people)
AIBA World Boxing Championships medalists
Welterweight boxers
20th-century Bulgarian people